Khalilan-e Sofla may refer to:

Khalilan-e Sofla, Kermanshah
Khalilan-e Sofla, Lorestan